Carol Colgan (born 12 April 1960) is a Canadian rower. She competed in the women's eight event at the 1984 Summer Olympics.

References

External links
 

1960 births
Living people
Canadian female rowers
Olympic rowers of Canada
Rowers at the 1984 Summer Olympics
Rowers from St. Catharines